Jüri Kaver (27 February 1974 in Võru) is an Estonian politician. He was a member of IX Riigikogu and former mayor Võru from 21 April 2011 to 11 November 2013.

References

Living people
Isamaa politicians
Estonian Reform Party politicians
Members of the Riigikogu, 1999–2003
Mayors of places in Estonia
University of Tartu alumni
People from Võru
Year of birth missing (living people)